Life University is a private university focused on training chiropractors and located in Marietta, Georgia, USA. It was established in 1974 by a chiropractor, Sid E. Williams.

History 

The university was founded in 1974 by Williams as "Life Chiropractic College"  on the site of a placer gold mine, next to Southern Technical Institute (later Southern Polytechnic State University and now Kennesaw State University - Marietta Campus). 22 students attended the first classes in January 1975.

In 1989, the name was shortened to "Life College", as it had recently had opened an undergraduate program and was no longer purely chiropractic. This undergraduate program allowed Life to establish an intercollegiate athletic program. By 1990, it had grown to become the largest college of chiropractic in the world. In 1996, Life College became Life University.

In March 2004, Guy Riekeman, the former chancellor of the Palmer Chiropractic University System, was appointed as the president of Life University. In 2017, Rob Scott took over as president of the university and Riekeman became chancellor.

Accreditation
The university is accredited by the Southern Association of Colleges and Schools to award associate, bachelor, master's and doctoral degrees. The doctoral degree program is also accredited by the Council on Chiropractic Education. Two programs in dietetics are accredited by the American Dietetic Association.

On June 7, 2002, the Commission on Accreditation of the Council on Chiropractic Education (CCE), which is the national organization that accredits chiropractic schools in the US, revoked the accreditation status of Life University. A federal judge retroactively restored the accreditation in February 2003 and placed the chiropractic program on a probationary status. With the accreditation being restored retroactively to before the decision to revoke the accreditation, the University officially never lost its accreditation. Eventually, after the aftermath of the accreditation dispute, Life University stabilized student enrollment and maintained its academic program.

Athletics 
The Life athletic teams are called the Running Eagles. The university is a member of the National Association of Intercollegiate Athletics (NAIA), primarily competing in the Southern States Athletic Conference (SSAC; formerly known as Georgia–Alabama–Carolina Conference (GACC) until after the 2003–04 school year) starting the 2022–23 academic year. The Running Eagles previously competed in Mid-South Conference (MSC) from 2014–15 to 2021–22; as an NAIA independent within the Association of Independent Institutions (AII) from 2008–09 to 2011–12 (and during the 2013–14 academic year), and in the TranSouth Athletic Conference (TranSouth or TSAC) during 2012–13.

Life competes in 20 intercollegiate varsity sports. Men's sports include basketball, bowling, cross country, rugby, soccer, swimming, track & field, volleyball and wrestling. Women's sports include basketball, bowling, cross country, lacrosse, rugby, soccer, swimming, track & field, volleyball and wrestling. Co-educational sports include cheerleading.

Intercollegiate rugby program 
The Running Eagles reached the national quarterfinals in 2011 in its first season. Life reached the national semi-finals in the 2011–12 season and finished the season ranked #2 in the US. In 2018 and 2019, Life U beat the California Golden Bears to become back-to-back national champions.

Life University has been successful in rugby sevens. It won the 2011 USA Rugby Sevens Collegiate National Championships. Life U won the spring 2012 Las Vegas Invitational, earning a place at the June 2012 Collegiate Rugby Championship, where Life U was undefeated in pool play and reached the semi-finals. The CRC tournament, played at PPL Park in Philadelphia, is the highest profile college rugby tournament in the US and is broadcast live every year on NBC. Life U won the fall 2012 South Independent 7s tournament. This victory earned Life an automatic place and a chance to defend its title at the fall 2012 USA Rugby Sevens Collegiate National Championships, when Life U went 5–1 and finished second in the tournament, losing in the Cup Championship match to rival Arkansas State. In 2013, Life U went 5–1 at the USA Rugby Sevens Collegiate National Championships to finish fifth.

Men's senior rugby 
Since 1986, Life U has played at a senior level, including in the Rugby Super League from 1997 to 2002. Life U rejoined the RSL in 2009.

References

External links 
 

 
Educational institutions established in 1974
Chiropractic schools in the United States
Universities and colleges accredited by the Southern Association of Colleges and Schools
Education in Cobb County, Georgia
Buildings and structures in Marietta, Georgia
1974 establishments in Georgia (U.S. state)
Private universities and colleges in Georgia (U.S. state)